Public artworks in Cambridge, Massachusetts include:

 Civil War Monument
 Galaxy: Earth Sphere, Kendall Square
 Irish Famine Memorial, Cambridge Common
 Statue of Charles Sumner, General MacArthur Square
 Statue of John Bridge, Cambridge Common
 Washington Gate, Cambridge Common
 Women's Community Cancer Project Mural, Harvard Square

Harvard University
The following artworks are displayed on the Harvard University campus:

 Discobolus
 Night Wall I
 Robert Stow Bradley Jr. Memorial
 Statue of John Harvard

Massachusetts Institute of Technology

The following artworks are displayed on the Massachusetts Institute of Technology campus:

 Alchemist
 Angola
 Birth of the Muses
 Elmo-MIT
 Guennette
 Invaders
 La Grande Voile (The Big Sail)
 Reclining Figure (Lincoln Center)
 Sean Collier Memorial
 Three-Piece Reclining Figure: Draped 1975
 Transparent Horizon
 TV Man or Five Piece Cube with Strange Hole
 Two Indeterminate Lines

Culture of Cambridge, Massachusetts
Cambridge, Massachusetts
Public art
 
Public art in Massachusetts
Tourist attractions in Cambridge, Massachusetts